Stone Memorial High School (SMHS) is one of two high schools in the Cumberland County School District and is in Crossville, Tennessee.

According to U.S. News & World Report, "The AP® participation rate at Stone Memorial High School is 27 percent. The student body makeup is 53 percent male and 47 percent female, and the total minority enrollment is 6 percent."  They have 1,053 students and 66 teachers.

References

External links

Public high schools in Tennessee
Education in Cumberland County, Tennessee
Buildings and structures in Cumberland County, Tennessee